Media Report to Women is an academic journal, published quarterly, which provides information on all types of media and the way they depict women and issues of interest to women. It also challenges the ways that women and girls are underrepresented overall, and their depiction "as victims or in outdated, stereotypical roles". The journal is published by Communication Research Associates, Inc., and its editor is Sheila Gibbons (vice president, Communication Research Associates, Inc.)

Abstracting and indexing 
 ProQuest
 EBSCO

References

External links 
 

Business and management journals
English-language journals
Feminist journals
Publications established in 1972
Quarterly journals
Women's studies journals